Jakar Dzong or Jakar Yugyal Dzong is the dzong or fortress of the Bumthang District in central Bhutan. It is located on a ridge above Jakar town in the Chamkhar valley of Bumthang. It is built on the site of an earlier temple established by the Ralung hierarch Yongzin Ngagi Wangchuk (1517–1554) when he came to Bhutan.

The name Jakar is derived from the word bjakhab, meaning "white bird", in reference to Jakar's foundation myth, according to which a roosting white bird signaled the proper and auspicious location to found a monastery around 1549.

References

External links 
Satellite map at Maplandia.com
 

Dzongs in Bhutan
1549 establishments